Cryptologia is a journal in cryptography published six times per year since January 1977. Its remit is all aspects of cryptography, with a special emphasis on historical aspects of the subject. The founding editors were Brian J. Winkel, David Kahn, Louis Kruh, Cipher A. Deavours and Greg Mellen. The current Editor-in-Chief is Craig Bauer.

The journal was initially published at the Rose-Hulman Institute of Technology. In July 1995, it moved to the United States Military Academy, and was then published by Taylor & Francis since the January 2006 issue (Volume 30, Number 1).

See also

 Journal of Cryptology
 Cryptogram
 Cryptology ePrint Archive

References

External links 
 Cryptologia home page

Cryptography journals
History of cryptography
Publications established in 1977
Rose–Hulman Institute of Technology
1977 establishments in Indiana